Highway 97 is a major highway in the Canadian province of British Columbia. It is the longest continuously numbered route in the province, running  and is the only route that runs the entire north–south length of the British Columbia, connecting the Canada–United States border near Osoyoos in the south to the British Columbia–Yukon boundary in the north at Watson Lake, Yukon.

The highway connects several major cities in BC Interior, including Kelowna, Kamloops, Prince George, and Dawson Creek. Within and near these cities, Highway 97 varies from a two-lane highway to a freeway with as many as six lanes. Some remote sections also remain unpaved and gravelled. The route takes its number from U.S. Route 97, with which it connects at the international border. The highway was initially designated '97' in 1953.

Route description 

The busiest section of Highway 97 is in West Kelowna, carrying almost 70,000 vehicles per day. Some sections in the northern regions of the province have as few as 250 vehicles per day.

Okanagan Highway

The Okanagan Highway is a  section of Highway 97 between the international border and the junction of Highway 97A north of Vernon. It is named for the Okanagan region of British Columbia, through which it largely passes. From Okanagan Falls, Highway 97 runs near the western shore of Skaha Lake before arriving at the locality of Kaleden, where Highway 3A diverges west.

 north of Kaleden, Highway 97 arrives at the city of Penticton. The highway enters the city of Kelowna upon landfall on the east shore of the lake.  east into the city centre, the highway reaches its junction with Highway 33. As the Okanagan is a very popular travel destination and also has the highest population in inland B.C. (about 300,000), this section of highway 97 is by far the busiest. Congestion is frequent - particularly near the William Bennett Bridge, and Southbound towards West Kelowna.

Four kilometres (2 mi) north of the Highway 33 junction, Highway 97 leaves the urbanized area of Kelowna (the municipal boundary is actually a further 12 km, 7 mi, north). For the next , the route travels well east of Okanagan Lake, passing through the community of Winfield. Prior to 2013, the highway ran alongside the west shore of Wood Lake to Oyama. A new  section of four-lane highway was constructed and opened to traffic at that time, which bypasses Oyama entirely to the north. The original section of the highway skirting the western shore of Wood Lake is now known as Pelmewash Parkway. Both Oyama and Winfield lie within the municipality of Lake Country.

Highway 97 then passes along the west shore of Kalamalka Lake before entering the city of Vernon and a junction with Highway 6 just south of the city centre.

Vernon-Kamloops-Cache Creek

As it travels westward, Highways 1 and 97 parallel the Thompson River, passing through the city of Kamloops, where the route shares a  wrong-way concurrency with Highway 5 (signed as 97 North and 5 South and vice versa) and intersects Highway 5A.

Cariboo Highway

Much of its length as far as Quesnel follows approximately the route of the original Cariboo Wagon Road, which was also known as the Queen's Highway. The Cariboo Wagon Road's lower stretches between Yale and Cache Creek were severed in many places by the construction of the Canadian Pacific Railway in the 1880s. That section, now part of the Trans-Canada, was rebuilt in the 1920s, when the name Cariboo Highway was first applied to the route, a designation which ran from Yale to Prince George, British Columbia (where portions of the route survive as the Old Cariboo Highway). North of Highway 99, Highway 97 travels  through Clinton, where the British Columbia Railway begins to roughly parallel Highway 97, as well as through the community of 70 Mile House before reaching a junction at 93 Mile House with Highway 24 (the Interlakes Highway). The roughly  section of highway between 70 Mile House and Highway 24 has been re-routed to a new expressway with a speed limit of 110km/h.

Over the next  continuing generally northward, the highway passes through McLeese Lake and Marguerite. En route, Highway 97 follows the east bank of the Fraser River to the city of Quesnel, and a junction with Highway 26. North of here, the highway veers away from the Fraser River, and the British Columbia Railway veers northwestward from it.

The term Cariboo Highway originally applied to the reconstructed route from Hope  through the Fraser Canyon to Cache Creek and Prince George. Constructed in 1924-25, the new gravel toll highway opened in 1926, giving road access to canyon communities cut off since the destruction of parts of the Cariboo Road by construction of the Canadian Pacific Railway in the 1880s. The Cariboo Highway designation for the Fraser Canyon portion of the route was supplanted with the completion and naming of the Trans-Canada Highway c.-1962. Portions of the old highway survive as local streets, some carrying the name Old Cariboo Highway (as in Prince George).

John Hart Highway

It then journeys northeast another  over the crest of the Rocky Mountains via the Pine Pass, at which point the time zone changes from Pacific Time to Mountain Time. After descending from the Pine Pass, the highway generally follows the Pine River northeast to its intersection with Highway 29 at the town of Chetwynd.

Alaska Highway

Here, the highway veers generally northwestward into wilderness spotted with tiny localities. As it passes over the Rocky Mountains, the highway parallels the Liard River before terminating just over the BC/Yukon boundary at Watson Lake, where the Alaska Highway is numbered as Yukon Highway 1.

Major intersections
From south to north:

References

External links 

Official Numbered Routes in British Columbia by British Columbia Driving & Transportation
 Old Cariboo Highway, U.Wash Digital Collections

097
Dawson Creek
Fort St. John, British Columbia
Transport in Kamloops
Transport in Kelowna
Transport in Penticton
097
Vernon, British Columbia
West Kelowna
Highways in the Okanagan